Thomas John Gilligan (21 June 1874 – 19 December 1957) was an Australian rules footballer who played for the South Melbourne Football Club in the Victorian Football League (VFL).

See also
 The Footballers' Alphabet

Notes

References 
 'Follower', "The Footballers' Alphabet", The Leader, (Saturday, 23 July 1898), p.17.

External links 

1874 births
1957 deaths
Australian rules footballers from Victoria (Australia)
Australian Rules footballers: place kick exponents
Sydney Swans players